= Trans and Nonbinary Kids Mix =

2020 children's music album

Compilation album by Various artists
- Released: July 22, 2020

Trans and Nonbinary Kids Mix is a 2020 children's music album with songs about the "trans and nonbinary experience".
